Walhain is an unincorporated community in Kewaunee County, Wisconsin, United States, within the town of Luxemburg. The community is located at the intersection of Walhain Road and Wisconsin Highway 54 about 2 miles west of Luxemburg.
The community was named by Florian Streyckman, who settled there in the 1856 and came from Walhain, a municipality in Belgium.

References

Unincorporated communities in Kewaunee County, Wisconsin
Unincorporated communities in Wisconsin